"Hold Your Head Up" is a song by the English rock band Argent, released as a single in 1972. The song was a Top 5 hit in the US, the UK, and the Canadian charts, peaking at No. 5 in all three countries. However, it was the band's only song to chart on the Billboard Hot 100. Billboard ranked it as the No. 50 song for 1972. The song appeared on the third Argent album All Together Now (1972).

Background, composition, and recording
The song was written by Chris White and credited to the songwriting partnership of White and Rod Argent.

Release and reception
The song was warmly received by music critics. Georgiy Starostin thought that it was the best track on All Together Now, the band's quintessential album. He called it "a solid, riffy tune whose main attractions are the gruff, almost war-march-style bassline" and praised Rod Argent's keyboard work. The Hammond B3 solo on the track was cited by Rick Wakeman as the greatest organ solo ever.

Chart history

Weekly charts

Year-end charts

References

Songs written by Rod Argent
1972 singles
Argent (band) songs
1972 songs
Columbia Records singles
Song recordings produced by Rod Argent
Songs written by Chris White (musician)